Savvin is a Russian masculine surname, its feminine counterpart is Savvina. It may refer to
Iya Savvina (1936–2011), Russian film actress
Roman Savvin (born 1972), Russian football player
Sergei Savvin (born 1987), Russian football player 
Vasily Savvin (1939–2020), Soviet and Russian military leader

See also
Savin (name)
Savina (name)

Russian-language surnames